Venter or Venters is an Afrikaans (and rarely, Jewish) surname, and may refer to:

Venter
AJ Venter (b. 1973), South African rugby union footballer
 Al J Venter (b. 1938), author
 André Venter (b. 1970), South African rugby union footballer
 Ben Venter (b. 1987), South African rugby union footballer
 Bill Venter (b. 1934), South African businessman
 Brendan Venter (b. 1969), South African rugby union footballer
 Christoffel Venter (1892–1977), South African military commander
 Craig Venter (b. 1946), American biologist and businessman
 Danny Venter (b. 1987), South African association football player
 F.A. Venter (1916–1997), Afrikaans writer
 Floris Venter (1886–unknown), South African cyclist
 Francois Venter (b. 1991), South African rugby union footballer
 Hanco Venter (b. 1993), South African rugby union footballer
 Henco Venter (b. 1992), South African rugby union footballer
 Jacobus Johannes Venter (1814–1889), South African Boer political figure
 Jan Venter (b. 1988), South African swimmer
 Kyle Venter (b. 1991), American soccer player
 Mariella Venter (b. 2000), South African swimmer
 Orla Venter (b. 1976), Namibian long jumper
 Rina Venter (b. 1938), South African Minister of Heath from 1989 to 1994
 Ruan Venter (b. 1992), South African rugby union footballer
 Shaun Venter (b. 1987), South African rugby union footballer
 Walter Venter (b. 1984), South African rugby union footballer

Venters
Alex Venters (1913–1959), Scottish footballer
Jock Venters (1910–1978), Scottish footballer
Jonny Venters (b. 1985), American baseball player

Places
 Venter, the Hungarian name for Vintere village, Holod Commune, Bihor County, Romania
 Venter, Virginia, United States
 Ventersdorp, North West Province, South Africa

Origin 
The commonly accepted origin of the surname finds its roots in the Netherlands, however due to poor record-keeping there are doubts whether or not this is true. During the Church Reformation, the persecuted were known to board ships bound for far-off lands (South Africa being one with its recent establishment as a trading post for the Dutch East India Company (VOC) and their representative Jan van Riebeeck in 1652. During these escapes names were often changed, thus muddying the water.

One disputing theory is that Venter does not derive from the Dutch "Van Deventer" , but rather from the French "Fender" as Huguenots sought refuge in the new settlement in the mid- to late 17th century.

There are still many missing links in the genealogy of the Venter family.

See also
 Abdomen – the term venter may refer to the ventral side of an animal or plant organ

Afrikaans-language surnames